The 2011 Girabola was the 33rd season of top-tier football in Angola. The season ran from 12 March to 6 November 2011. Interclube were the defending champions, having won their 2nd Angolan championship in 2010.

16 teams were involved in the league and the bottom three teams were relegated to the 2012 Gira Angola.

Recreativo Libolo were crowned champions, while FC Cabinda, Primeiro de Maio and Académica Lobito were relegated. Love Cabungula of Petro Luanda finished as top scorer with 20 goals.

Angola was informed by CAF that it will have only 2 teams (one team in each competition) competing in the 2012 CAF club competitions, according to the latest CAF 5-Year Ranking. The Girabola champion will play in the 2012 CAF Champions League.

Teams
C.D. Huíla, SC Petróleos de Cabinda, and Sport Lubango e Benfica were directly relegated to the Gira Angola after finishing 12th, 13th and 14th respectively in the previous year's standings. They were replaced by First Division Série A champions Progresso, Série B champions Primeiro de Maio, and Académica Lobito, winners of the promotion play-off between Série A and B runners-up.

Changes from 2010 season
Relegated: Desportivo da Huíla, Sporting de Cabinda, Benfica do Lubango 
Promoted: Académica do Lobito, Primeiro de Maio, 
Progresso do Sambizanga

League table

Results

Season statistics

Top scorers

References

External links
Girabola 2011 stats at jornaldosdesportos.sapo.ao
Federação Angolana de Futebol

Girabola seasons
1
Angola
Angola